Ian Freeman (born 8 July 1973) is a British judoka.  He competed in the men's half-lightweight event at the 1992 Summer Olympics.

Freeman is a champion of Great Britain, winning the British Judo Championships in 1992.

References

External links
 

1973 births
Living people
British male judoka
Olympic judoka of Great Britain
Judoka at the 1992 Summer Olympics
People from Camberley